Villette is a comune (municipality) in the Province of Verbano-Cusio-Ossola in the Italian region Piedmont, located about  northeast of Turin and about  north of Verbania.

Villette borders the following municipalities: Craveggia, Malesco, Re.

Demographic evolution

References

External links
 www.comune.villette.vb.it/

Cities and towns in Piedmont